La Loche River may refer to:

 La Loche River (Saskatchewan)
 La Loche River (Ashuapmushuan River), Quebec